Galeh Bardar may refer to:
 Galeh Bardar, Khuzestan
 Galeh Bardar, Lorestan